John Tetley Rowe (1861–1915) was an Anglican priest, most notably Archdeacon of Rochester and Canon Residential of Rochester Cathedral from 1908 until his death.

Rowe was educated at Giggleswick School; and Trinity College, Cambridge.  He was ordained in 1882 and was in charge of the Mission district in New Church Road, Camberwell. He held incumbencies in Chatham from 1895 to 1907 and Rushall before his appointment as Archdeacon.

He died on 29 April 1915 after collapsing at London Victoria station.

Notes

1861 births
1915 deaths
Alumni of Trinity College, Cambridge
People educated at Giggleswick School
19th-century English Anglican priests
20th-century English Anglican priests
Archdeacons of Rochester